Josef Ponn (born 18 October 1905, date of death unknown) was a German cross-country skier. He competed in the men's 50 kilometre event at the 1936 Winter Olympics.

References

1905 births
Year of death missing
German male cross-country skiers
Olympic cross-country skiers of Germany
Cross-country skiers at the 1936 Winter Olympics
Place of birth missing
20th-century German people